The 2016 Mallorca Open was a women's tennis tournament played on grass courts. It was the 1st edition of the Mallorca Open, and part of the International category of the 2016 WTA Tour. It took place at Santa Ponsa Tennis Club in Majorca, Spain, from June 13 through June 19, 2016.

Points and prize money

Point distribution

Prize money

WTA singles main-draw entrants

Seeds

 1 Rankings are as of June 6, 2016.

Other entrants
The following players received wildcards into the main draw:
 Paula Badosa Gibert
 Daniela Hantuchová 
 Sara Sorribes Tormo

The following players received entry from the qualifying draw:
 Ana Bogdan
 Verónica Cepede Royg
 Sorana Cîrstea 
 Elise Mertens

Withdrawals
Before the tournament
  Annika Beck → replaced by  Yaroslava Shvedova
  Mona Barthel → replaced by  Ana Konjuh
  Sara Errani → replaced by  Carina Witthöft
  Johanna Larsson → replaced by  Francesca Schiavone
  Monica Niculescu → replaced by  Anastasija Sevastova
  Zhang Shuai → replaced by  Pauline Parmentier

WTA doubles main-draw entrants

Seeds

1 Rankings are as of 6 June 2016.

Other entrants 
The following pairs received wildcards into the doubles main draw:
  Eugenie Bouchard /  Sabine Lisicki
  Kirsten Flipkens /  Ana Ivanovic
The following pair received entry as alternates:
  Nao Hibino /  Emily Webley-Smith

Withdrawals
Before the tournament
  Elise Mertens (right hand injury)
  Mandy Minella (right arm injury)

Champions

Singles 

  Caroline Garcia def.  Anastasija Sevastova, 6–3, 6–4

Doubles 

  Gabriela Dabrowski /  María José Martínez Sánchez def.  Anna-Lena Friedsam /  Laura Siegemund, 6–4, 6–2

References

External links 
 

Mallorca Open
Mallorca Open
2016